"Change Partners" is a popular song written by Irving Berlin for the 1938 film Carefree, in which it was introduced by Fred Astaire. The song was nominated for an Academy Award for Best Original Song in 1938, but lost out to "Thanks for the Memory."

Hit versions in 1938 included those by Astaire, Ozzie Nelson, Jimmy Dorsey and Lawrence Welk. The song reached No. 1 on Billboards Record Buying Guide.

The song has subsequently been recorded by many artists.

Notable recordings 
Steve Lawrence – for his album Academy Award Losers (1964)
Frank Sinatra - Francis Albert Sinatra & Antônio Carlos Jobim (1967)
Bing Crosby - A Couple of Song and Dance Men (1975)
Andy Williams - Close Enough for Love (1986)
Barbara Cook - Live from London (1994) (in medley with "I See Your Face")
Harry Connick, Jr. - Come By Me (1999)

References 

1938 songs
Songs written by Irving Berlin
Songs written for films
Fred Astaire songs
Frank Sinatra songs
Ella Fitzgerald songs
Andy Williams songs